Cottom is a surname. Notable people with the surname include:

Brandon Cottom (born 1992), American football fullback
Norman Cottom (1912–1972), American basketball player
Serge Van Cottom (born 1953), Belgian weightlifter
Tressie McMillan Cottom, American writer, sociologist and professor